Spin-stabilized magnetic levitation is a phenomenon of magnetic levitation whereby a spinning magnet or array of magnets (typically as a top) is levitated via magnetic forces above another magnet or array of magnets, and stabilised by gyroscopic effect due to a spin that is neither too fast, nor too slow to allow for a necessary precession.

The phenomenon was originally discovered through invention by Vermont inventor Roy M. Harrigan in the 1970s. On May 3, 1983 Harrigan received a United States patent for his original levitation device based upon this phenomenon he discovered. Independent of Harrigan, a Pennsylvanian inventor named Joseph Chieffo made the same discovery in 1984 employing a flat base magnet, a geometry that proved a significant change over his predecessor's design which relied upon a dish shaped mounting of magnets for the base. Chieffo's design, publicized in a 1991 edition of the periodical "MAGNETS IN YOUR FUTURE", further differed from Harrigan's in its incorporation of an un-weighted top.  Harrigan's technology, either entirely or in conjunction with Chieffo's flat-base innovation,  provided the basis for the development of a mass marketed levitating toy top sold under the brand name, 'Levitron'.

In 2012 and 2014 Max Michaelis reported operating Levitron brand magnetic tops at inclination angles of 45°  and  90° (i.e. with the spin axis, horizontal) after employing novel configurations for the supporting magnetic fields.

Physics 
Earnshaw's theorem does not allow for a static configuration of permanent magnets to stably levitate another permanent magnet or materials that are paramagnetic or ferromagnetic against gravity. This theorem does not apply to devices consisting of a properly configured magnetic base and corresponding magnetic top, however, because the non-static nature of the spinning top acts as a gyroscope to prevent its magnetic field from fully aligning itself in the same direction as that of the primary supporting toroidal field of the magnetic base (i.e.: via the top flipping). In a vertical orientated configuration this gyroscopic property combined with the top's precession allows it to respond dynamically to the direction of the local toroidally shaped field of its base magnet(s) and remain levitating about a central point in space above the base where the forces acting on the top (gravitational, magnetic, and gyroscopic) are in equilibrium thereby allowing the top to rest in an energy minimum well. (see: magnetic levitation)

In the laboratory, experimental setups are able to levitate tops for indefinite periods by measuring the spin rate and maintaining it using a drive coil. However, variations in temperature can affect the stability, and without ambient temperature control the top will eventually fall after hours or days due to the temperature coefficient of the magnets.

The physics of the magnetic stability is similar to magnetic gradient traps.

Inclined or horizontal axis levitation is accomplished by superposing a “macro-trap” on the precessional “micro-trap” first described by Sir Michael Berry and Simon, Heflinger and Ridgway. The macro-trap is generated by a combination of two magnetic “V”s as well as a puller magnet, situated directly above the Levitron. The puller acts like the string of a pendulum.

See also
Electromagnetic suspension
Electrodynamic wheel
Magnetic bearing
Electrodynamic bearing
Levitron

References

Magnetic levitation
Articles containing video clips
Tops